PantherNOW (formerly The Beacon) is the student-run newspaper of Florida International University in Miami, Florida and has a circulation of 7,500. PantherNOW is published monthly in a compact format during the fall and spring semesters. It is split into four sections, News, reporting mainly on campus and local events, Entertainment, Sports, and Opinion. PantherNOW is available free campus-wide mainly in the residence halls, Graham Center and campus buildings and usually contains a mix of campus and local news coverage.

PantherNOW staffers air radio programs on WRGP "The Roar", FIU's student radio station, which is commonly run with PantherNOW.

References

External links
PantherNOW.com

Student newspapers published in Florida
Florida International University
Newspapers established in 1972
1972 establishments in Florida

fr:Le Phare (La Cinquième Dimension)